Merthyr was a borough constituency centred on the town of Merthyr Tydfil in Wales.  It returned one Member of Parliament (MP)  to the House of Commons of the Parliament of the United Kingdom.

The constituency was created for the 1918 general election, and abolished for the 1950 general election, when it was largely replaced by the new constituency of Merthyr Tydfil.

Members of Parliament

Election results

Elections in the 1910s

Elections in the 1920s

Elections in the 1930s

Elections in the 1940s

See also 
 1934 Merthyr by-election

Notes

References 

 
 

History of Glamorgan
Historic parliamentary constituencies in South Wales
Constituencies of the Parliament of the United Kingdom established in 1918
Constituencies of the Parliament of the United Kingdom disestablished in 1950
Politics of Merthyr Tydfil